The 2014 NACRA Rugby Championship, the seventh edition of the NACRA Rugby Championship, was a rugby union championship for Tier 3 North American and Caribbean teams. Pool play took place between 10 May and 28 June. A championship game followed in June, with Guyana defeating USA South in extra time. Mexico was promoted to the North Championship, with Bermuda moving down, due to the latter's inability to organize the promotion/relegation match. In the South division, Barbados defeated Curaçao to remain in the Championship.

The championship is split between North and South zones, which each have a three-team Championship and four-team Cup. The winner of each Championship play for the final, championship game, and a promotion/relegation game is played in each zone, between the winner of the Cup, and the last place team of the Championship.

Competition points are different from most rugby union tournaments: Two points are awarded for a win, one for a draw. There are also bonus points for scoring four tries and for losing within a margin of 7 points or less.

Teams 

Fourteen teams will take place in this year's tournament. They are seeded into two pools based on their regional rankings, in brackets.

North Zone

North Zone Championship

North Zone Cup

North Zone Championship relegation play-off
The North Zone Championship relegation play-off was played between the last-placed team of the North Zone Championship, Bermuda, and the winner of the North Zone Cup, Mexico. However, Bermuda was unable to organize the match, and Mexico moved to the Championship by default.

South Zone

South Zone Championship

South Zone Cup

South Zone Championship relegation play-off
The South Zone Championship relegation play-off will be played between the last-placed team of the South Zone Championship, Barbados, and the winner of the South Zone Cup, Curaçao. The winner will play in the 2015 South Zone Championship.

Final 
The final will be played between the winner of the North Zone Championship, USA South, and the winner of the South Zone Championship, Guyana.

Related Page 
 NACRA Rugby Championship

References

External links 
 NACRA Website

2014
2014 rugby union tournaments for national teams
2014 in North American rugby union
rugby union